Yothinburana School is a publicly funded secondary school with nearly 4,000 students in Bangkok, Thailand under the jurisdiction of the General Education Department of Ministry of Education. It is in the Bang Sue District of Bangkok, having moved from the Dusit District in 2012.

Partnership
Yothinburana School has a partnership with:
  Ivybridge Community College, Devon, England.

References

Schools in Bangkok
Bang Sue district